Gambueh or Gombueh may refer to:
 Gambueh-ye Bozorg
 Gambueh-ye Kuchek